The Binnenmüritz is a lake in the Müritz National Park, Mecklenburg-Vorpommern, Germany. At an elevation of 62.4 m, its surface area is 0.184 km². It is really a bay of Germany's largest inland lake, Lake Müritz.

Lakes of Mecklenburg-Western Pomerania
Waren (Müritz)
LBinnenmuritz